Jaffna District ( Yāḻppāṇam Māvaṭṭam;  yāpanaya distrikkaya) is one of the 25 districts of Sri Lanka, the second level administrative division of the country. The district is administered by a District Secretariat headed by a District Secretary (previously known as a Government Agent) appointed by the central government of Sri Lanka. The capital of the district is the city of Jaffna.

History 
Between the 5th century BC and the 13th century AD present day Jaffna District was part of various Kingdoms such as Pandya, Chola, Pallava, Kalinga, Rajarata. Jaffna District was thereafter part of the pre-colonial Jaffna kingdom. The district then came under Portuguese, Dutch and British control. In 1815 the British gained control of the entire island of Ceylon. They divided the island into three ethnic-based administrative structures: Low Country Sinhalese, Kandyan Sinhalese and Tamil. Jaffna District was part of the Tamil administration. In 1833, in accordance with the recommendations of the Colebrooke-Cameron Commission, the ethnic based administrative structures were unified into a single administration divided into five geographic provinces. Jaffna District, together with Mannar District and Vanni District, formed the new Northern Province. At the time that Ceylon gained independence, Jaffna was one of the three districts located in the Northern Province. Parts of the district were transferred to newly created Mullaitivu District in September 1978. Kilinochchi District was carved out of the southern part of Jaffna District in February 1984.

Geography 
Jaffna District is located in the far north of Sri Lanka in the Northern Province and occupies most of the Jaffna Peninsula. It is divided into four areas geographically:
 Thenmarachchi or Thenmaradchi
 Vadamarachchi or Vadamaradchi
 Valikamam
 Jaffna Islands

Administrative units 
Jaffna District is divided into 15 Divisional Secretary's Division (DS Divisions), each headed by a Divisional Secretary (previously known as an Assistant Government Agent). The DS Divisions are further sub-divided into 435 Grama Niladhari Divisions (GN Divisions).

Demographics

Population 
Jaffna District's population was 583,378 in 2012. It is one of the most densely populated districts of Sri Lanka. The population of the district is almost exclusively Sri Lankan Tamil.

The population of the district, like the rest of the north and east of Sri Lanka, has been heavily affected by the civil war. The war killed an estimated 100,000 people. Several hundred thousand Sri Lankan Tamils, possibly as much as one million, emigrated to the West during the war. Many Sri Lankan Tamils also moved to the relative safety of the capital Colombo. Most of the Sri Lankan Moors and Sinhalese who lived in the district fled to other parts of Sri Lanka or were forcibly expelled by the rebel Liberation Tigers of Tamil Eelam.

Ethnicity

Religion

Politics and government

Local government 
Jaffna District has 17 local authorities of which one is a Municipal Council, three are Urban Councils and the remaining 13 are Divisional Councils (Pradesha Sabhai or Pradeshiya Sabha).

Twinned Regions 
On 18 October 2016, Jaffna District twinned with the Royal Borough of Kingston upon Thames in London. This has been a milestone to build “greater understanding and sharing knowledge” in the fields of governance, healthcare and education.

Notes

References

External links 

 Jaffna District Secretariat 

 
Districts of Sri Lanka